Concerto Suite for Electric Guitar and Orchestra in E Flat Minor Op.1 is the eleventh studio album by guitarist Yngwie Malmsteen, released on 4 February 1998 through Canyon International. The album was Malmsteen's first attempt at a classical concerto suite featuring electric guitar solos. All of the music was composed by Malmsteen, though his compositions were scored by his friend and fellow musician David Rosenthal. The music is conducted by Yoel Levi, and performed by the Czech Philharmonic.

Malmsteen has been keen to emphasize that unlike other collaborations between rock musicians and classical orchestras (such as Deep Purple's Concerto for Group and Orchestra), which feature a rock group playing with orchestral accompaniment, this is orchestral music which happens to have an electric guitar as its solo instrument. He has acknowledged that in many of the pieces he had to overdub his guitar solos in order to make them "fit". However, the entire piece has since been performed live in Japan with the New Japan Philharmonic and is available as a DVD release.

Track listing

References

1998 albums
Yngwie Malmsteen albums
1998 classical albums